The score for The Last Starfighter was composed and conducted by Craig Safan. In 1984, a soundtrack album was released on LP by CD by Southern Cross Records.

The Southern Cross album includes two songs written for the movie by Safan and Mark Mueller. Two other songs  written for the movie ("Satisfy The Night" from Karen Blake and Greg Prestopino and Clif Magness; "Red Eyes") remain unreleased.

Southern Cross track listing

In 1995 Intrada Records issued an expanded redition, with the tracks in chronological order and the complete end credits ("Into The Starscape").

Intrada 1995 track listing

In 2015 Intrada Records issued the complete, remastered edition.

Intrada 2015 track listing

Personnel
Music Composed, Conducted and Produced by: Craig Safan
Orchestrations by: Alf Clausen, Craig Safan and Joel Rosenbaum
Electronics Engineer: Rick Riccio
Orchestra Recording Engineer: Lyle Burbridge
Music Supervisor: David Franco
Score Recorded at: Metro-Goldwyn-Mayer
Music Editors: Dan Johnson and Ken Johnson

References

1984 soundtrack albums
Science fiction film soundtracks